is a Japanese actress and voice actress who works for Tokyo Actor's Consumer's Cooperative Society.

Filmography 

Attack No. 1, Midori Hayakawa
Sabu to Ichi Torimono Hikae, Okyo
Devilman, Miki Makimura
Dororon Enma-kun, Yukikohime
Kimba the White Lion (1966 series)
Kamui the Ninja

Tokusatsu
Android Kikaider, Dark robot Pink armadillo
Himitsu Sentai Gorenger, Big Ear Masked
Battle Fever J (1979-1980) - Icicle Monster / Kuchisake Monster / Monshiro Ocho "Illusion Monster" (voice)
Denshi Sentai Denziman (1980-1981) - Dokugaler / Aladdinlar / Deathmaskler (voice)
Dengeki Sentai Changeman (1985) - Jellar (voice)
Barom One

References

External links 
 Profile in Tokyo Actor's Consumer's Cooperative Society
 
 Sumie Sakai at GamePlaza-Haruka Voice Acting Database 

1945 births
Japanese voice actresses
Living people
Voice actresses from Tokyo
20th-century Japanese actresses
21st-century Japanese actresses
Tokyo Actor's Consumer's Cooperative Society voice actors